Shatsky (masculine, Cyrillic: Шацкий) or Shatskaya (feminine, Cyrillic: Шацкая) is a Russian surname referring to people who arrived from the city Shatsk or from the river Shat. It may refer to the following notable people:

Igor Shatsky (born 1989), Kazakhstani football goalkeeper
Igor Shatsky, member of the Russian band Boa
Nikolay Shatsky (1895–1960), Soviet geologist
Nina Arkadyevna Shatskaya (born 1970), Russian singer
Nina Sergeevna Shatskaya (1940–2021), Russian actress
Stanislav Shatsky (1878–1934), Russian/Soviet educator, writer, and administrator

References

Russian-language surnames